HMS Alfred was a 74-gun third rate ship of the line of the Royal Navy, launched on 22 October 1778 at Chatham Dockyard.

Career
She fought at the Battle of Cape St Vincent in 1780.

She was at the Battle of Saint Kitts, also known as the Battle of Frigate Bay, that took place on 25 and 26 January 1782 during the American Revolutionary War between a British fleet under Rear-Admiral Sir Samuel Hood and a larger French fleet under the Comte de Grasse. In the Battle of the Saintes on 9 April 1782 she led Hood's van squadron at the head of the fleet, impudently crossing in front of the French fleet in a taunting fashion.
The article on the Second Battle of Copenhagen (1807? ) shows her as being under the command of Captain John Bligh. Other sources show that William “Bounty Bastard” Bligh was present at this battle in a ship equipped with the newer carronade guns intended for close quarter anti-personnel work.

Lloyd's List reported on 17 May 1795 that Alfred had captured a French 22-gun corvette off Cape Finisterre. The corvette had been sailing to the West Indies and Alfred took her into Barbados.

Fate
Alfred was broken up in 1814.

Citations and references
Citations

References

Lavery, Brian (2003) The Ship of the Line - Volume 1: The development of the battlefleet 1650-1850. Conway Maritime Press. .

External links
 

Ships of the line of the Royal Navy
Alfred-class ships of the line
1778 ships